Axel Roos (born 19 August 1964) is a German football coach and a former player.

Born in Rodalben, Roos started his professional career in 1984 when he first signed a contract for the Bundesliga-Team 1. FC Kaiserslautern. He went on to win the Bundesliga in 1991 and 1998, the DFB-Pokal in 1990 and 1996, as well as the Supercup in 1991. Roos was loyal to his team throughout his entire professional career.

From 2003 to 2006 Ross was assistant coach to Hans-Peter Briegel at the Albania national team. Since 2007 he runs a football school.

Honours
1. FC Kaiserslautern
 Bundesliga: 1990–91, 1997–98; runner-up 1993–94
 DFB-Pokal: 1989–90, 1995–96
 DFB-Supercup: 1991

References

External links
 Axel Roos Football Academy Homepage 

1964 births
Living people
People from Rodalben
German footballers
West German footballers
Footballers from Rhineland-Palatinate
Association football midfielders
Bundesliga players
2. Bundesliga players
1. FC Kaiserslautern II players
1. FC Kaiserslautern players
German football managers